The 2015–16 Deportivo Toluca F.C. season was the 99th season in the football club's history and the 63rd consecutive season in the top flight of Mexican football. In addition to the Liga MX and Copa MX, the club also competed in the Copa Libertadores.

Players

Squad information

Players and squad numbers last updated on 28 October 2018.Note: Flags indicate national team as has been defined under FIFA eligibility rules. Players may hold more than one non-FIFA nationality.

Competitions

Overview

Torneo Apertura

League table

Results summary

Apertura Copa MX

Group stage

Round 1

Toluca won the round 5–3 on aggregate

Round 2

Toluca won the round 4–2 on aggregate

Round 3

Toluca won the round 5–2 on aggregate

Round of 16

Semifinal

Torneo Clausura

League table

Results summary

Copa Libertadores

Second stage

Toluca joined the competition in the second stage.

Final stages

Round of 16

Statistics

Goals

Hat-tricks

(H) – Home ; (A) – Away

Clean sheets

References

External links

Mexican football clubs 2015–16 season
Deportivo Toluca F.C. seasons